3548 Eurybates is a carbonaceous Jupiter trojan from the Greek camp and the parent body of the Eurybates family, approximately  in diameter. It is a target to be visited by the Lucy mission in August 2027. Discovered during the second Palomar–Leiden Trojan survey in 1973, it was later named after Eurybates from Greek mythology. This C-type asteroid is among the 60 largest known Jupiter trojans and has a rotation period of 8.7 hours. Eurybates has one kilometer-sized satellite, named Queta, that was discovered in images taken by the Hubble Space Telescope in September 2018.

Discovery 
Eurybates was discovered on 19 September 1973, by Dutch astronomers Ingrid and Cornelis van Houten at Leiden, on photographic plates taken by Tom Gehrels at the Palomar Observatory in California, United States. Since the discovery of 588 Achilles by Max Wolf in 1906, more than 7,000 Jupiter trojans, with nearly 4,600 bodies in the Greek camp, have already been discovered.

Palomar–Leiden Trojan survey 
While the discovery date aligns with the second Palomar–Leiden Trojan survey, Eurybates has not received a  prefixed survey designation, which was assigned for the discoveries made by the fruitful collaboration between the Palomar and Leiden observatories in the 1960s and 1970s. Gehrels used Palomar's Samuel Oschin telescope (also known as the 48-inch Schmidt Telescope), and shipped the photographic plates to Ingrid and Cornelis van Houten at Leiden Observatory where astrometry was carried out. The trio are credited with the discovery of several thousand asteroids.

Orbit and classification 
Eurybates is a dark Jupiter trojan asteroid orbiting in the leading Greek camp at Jupiter's  Lagrangian point, 60° ahead of Jupiter's orbit in a 1:1 resonance (see Trojans in astronomy). It orbits the Sun at a distance of 4.7–5.7 AU once every 11 years and 10 months (4,321 days; semi-major axis of 5.19 AU). Its orbit has an eccentricity of 0.09 and an inclination of 8° with respect to the ecliptic.

Eurybates family 
Eurybates is the parent body of the small Eurybates family, with 218 known members of carbonaceous and/or primitive composition. Only a few families have been identified among the Jovian asteroids; four of them in the Greek camp. This potentially collisional family was first characterized by Jakub Rozehnal and Miroslav Brož in 2011, and further described in 2014. Members of this family include the Jupiter trojans 5258 Rhoeo, 8060 Anius, 9818 Eurymachos,  and 360072 Alcimedon.

Physical characteristics 

Eurybates has been characterized as a carbonaceous C-type asteroid by both the Lucy mission team and Brian Warner's Lightcurve Data Base. The overall spectral type for members of the Eurybates family is that of a C- and P-type.

Rotational lightcurves 
In May 1992, a rotational lightcurve of Eurybates was obtained from photometric observations by Stefano Mottola and Maria Gonano–Beurer using the now decommissioned ESO 1-metre telescope at La Silla Observatory in northern Chile. Lightcurve analysis gave a rotation period of 8.711 hours with a brightness variation of 0.20 magnitude. In October 2010, photometric observations by American astronomer Robert Stephens at the Goat Mountain Astronomical Research Station  in California gave a concurring period of 8.73 hours and an amplitude of 0.19 magnitude.

Eurybates has an axial tilt of 150° with respect to the ecliptic, making it a retrograde rotator.

Diameter and albedo 

According to the surveys carried out by the Infrared Astronomical Satellite IRAS, the Japanese Akari satellite, and NASA's Wide-field Infrared Survey Explorer with its subsequent NEOWISE mission, Eurybates measures between 63.89 and 72.14 kilometers in diameter and its surface has an albedo between 0.052 and 0.060. The Collaborative Asteroid Lightcurve Link agrees with IRAS, and derives an albedo of 0.0491 and a diameter of 72.08 kilometers with an absolute magnitude of 9.6.

Naming 

This minor planet was named after Eurybates, the Ancient hero from Greek mythology, who was a herald for the Greek armies during the Trojan War. The official naming citation was published by the Minor Planet Center on 28 April 1991.

Lucy mission target 

Eurybates is planned to be visited by the Lucy spacecraft which launched in 2021.

Satellite 

Eurybates has one known satellite, named Queta after Mexican Olympic athlete Enriqueta Basilio. Provisionally designated S/2018 (3548) 1, the satellite was discovered by Keith S. Noll and colleagues in images taken with the Hubble Space Telescope in September 2018. Subsequent follow-up observations later confirmed the satellite's existence, and the discovery was announced on 9 January 2020. The satellite was given the name Queta on 15 October 2020, in accordance with the International Astronomical Union's Olympic athlete naming convention for small Jupiter trojans (H > 12). In the naming citation, Enriqueta Basilio was recognized as the first woman torchbearer at the 1968 Summer Olympics, analogous to the role of heralds like Eurybates.

Queta is extremely faint, with an apparent magnitude of ~26.77. It is probably a fragment of Eurybates since it is part of a known collisional family. The presence of the satellite does not pose any adverse effects on the Lucy mission, though it provides an additional object for the spacecraft to study during its flyby in 2027.

References

External links 
 Long-term evolution of asteroid families among Jovian Trojans, Jakub Rozehnal and Miroslav Brož (2014)
 Asteroid Lightcurve Database (LCDB), query form (info )
 Dictionary of Minor Planet Names, Google books
 Discovery Circumstances: Numbered Minor Planets (1)-(5000) – Minor Planet Center
 
 

003548
003548
Discoveries by Cornelis Johannes van Houten
Discoveries by Ingrid van Houten-Groeneveld
Discoveries by Tom Gehrels
Named minor planets
003548
003548
19730919